Viktor Ryashko (born 27 November 1992) is a Ukrainian football midfielder.

Career
Ryashko spent some years in the Sportive Youth system in Uzhhorod. He made his debut in the Ukrainian Premier League in a match against FC Vorskla Poltava entraining in the second half-time on 26 May 2013.

Personal life
He is the son of Ukrainian football manager Viktor Ryashko and older brother of the footballer Mykhaylo Ryashko.

References

External links 
 
 

Ukrainian footballers
FC Hoverla Uzhhorod players
Association football midfielders
1992 births
Living people
Ukrainian Premier League players
Ukrainian First League players
Ukrainian Second League players
Balmazújvárosi FC players
Kazincbarcikai SC footballers
Ukrainian expatriate footballers
Ukrainian expatriate sportspeople in Hungary
Expatriate footballers in Hungary
FC Bukovyna Chernivtsi players
FC Uzhhorod players
Ukraine youth international footballers